Martin Fong (died 2014) was a  film producer, director, cinematographer, stylist, actor, celebrity photographer, and was notable as one of the first major American tap dancers of Chinese descent to dance on the Las Vegas strip.

James Wong Howe
Fong was raised by cinematographer James Wong Howe, A.S.C., who worked on over 130 movies, won 2 Academy Awards and received 16 Academy Awards Nominations. Howe was also Fong's godfather and mentor. Fong used to display Howe's original camera equipment from the film Gone With the Wind in the foyer of his Hollywood, California mansion, along with Howe's projectors and editing equipment like Moviola devices, also photographs of the sets and Howe working on Gone With the Wind, Chinese language newspaper stories and photographs of himself with his godfather. Fong collected Howe memorabilia with the intention to later create a James Wong Howe museum.

Martial arts
Fong studied martial arts under Bruce Lee early in the career of both men. And, while Fong was in Hong Kong making movies, Bruce Lee joined him on the set and substantially helped him to understand the importance of camera angles in fighting scenes.

Acting career: Spy television and films
Fong began his acting career at the age of 8 in Hong Kong, appearing in several films. Fong moved to America to be raised by Howe. His first American acting job was in Never So Few, starring Frank Sinatra, who introduced him to the  Las Vegas strip and tap dancing there.  Fong appeared in Hawaiian Eye, The Islander, Run for Your Life, then more extensively on the television series I Spy. Fong can be seen in photographs consulting on espionage on the set of the James Bond film Octopussy.

Tap dance
Early in his career, Fong was a Las Vegas tap dancer who danced with the Rat Pack - Frank Sinatra, Sammy Davis Junior, and Dean Martin. Fong's photograph is the entrance photograph at the MGM Grand Hotel. A controversy arose in the 1960s when Fong, a Chinese American, was on stage dancing with line of Caucasian women, mixing races in a city that catered to tourists from the segregated south. The women were then dressed in Asian costumes and had their faces and eyes painted to appear Oriental, so as to avoid controversy. He later dated the blonde co-star of the film Octopussy, this time without controversy, due to the rapid pace of improving race relations in the 1960s.

Photography, film production, film direction, and cinematography
Fong did celebrity photographs from his photography studio in his Hollywood mansion from the 1960s until his death. Fong studied production, direction, and cinematography, casting, and photography on the sets of films being shot by Howe, and at the University of Southern California. He produced and directed feature films in Hong Kong, and commercials in Hollywood and Japan, with Hideki Tanaka. Fong spent the rest of his time writing screenplays, some of them currently in development.

Personal life
Fong was born into a family of film industry professionals in Hong Kong. He then moved to San Francisco, to be raised by his godfather James Wong Howe. Fong was a member of the Screen Actors Guild, and Hollywood Hill, an association of entertainment industry executives dedicated to using the industry to promote positive social change. As of 2012, Fong lived in his Hollywood mansion at the foot of Griffith Park, where he collected clothing and Hollywood memorabilia, consulted on fashion. Fong died in 2014.

External links

Hollywood Hill website

Hong Kong emigrants to the United States
American people of Chinese descent
American male actors
American tap dancers
American filmmakers
American photographers
Year of birth missing
2014 deaths